John Shmyr (January 2, 1945 - November 11, 2006) was a Canadian  professional ice hockey player who played 89 games in the World Hockey Association for the Winnipeg Jets, Chicago Cougars and Vancouver Blazers. His brother Paul Shmyr, had a long career playing in the National Hockey League and WHA.

External links

1945 births
2006 deaths
Canadian ice hockey defencemen
Winnipeg Jets (WHA) players
Chicago Cougars players
Vancouver Blazers players